Delonte Maurice West (born July 26, 1983) is an American former professional basketball player. He played in the National Basketball Association (NBA) for the Boston Celtics, Seattle SuperSonics, Cleveland Cavaliers, and Dallas Mavericks. He also played professionally for the Fujian Xunxing and Shanghai Sharks of the Chinese Basketball Association and the Texas Legends of the NBA G League. Prior to playing professionally, West played college basketball at Saint Joseph's University.

High school career
West went to Eleanor Roosevelt High School in Greenbelt, Maryland, where he excelled at basketball, teaming with fellow future NBA player Eddie Basden. He led the Roosevelt Raiders to their first state tournament appearance. They made it to the Maryland 4A championship, where Delonte had 22 points and 8 rebounds, but the Raiders lost 70–58. He was named Washington Post All Met Basketball Player of the Year due to his averages of 20.2 points, 6.5 rebounds, 3.9 assists, and 3.1 steals per game.

College career
At Saint Joseph's University, West formed what was widely regarded as the best backcourt in the country along with John R. Wooden Award and Naismith Award winner Jameer Nelson. As a junior, West averaged 18.9 points and 6.7 assists per game, shooting 41% from three-point range. His efforts helped the 2003–04 Saint Joseph's Hawks to go 27–0 in the regular season and earn an Elite Eight appearance in the NCAA Tournament. Saint Joseph's finished the season at 30–2.

Professional career

Boston Celtics (2004–2007)

West chose to leave St. Joseph's after his junior campaign where he was selected by the Boston Celtics as the 24th pick in the 2004 NBA draft. In his first season, he struggled with injuries, playing a total of just 39 games, mostly coming off the bench. He averaged 4.5 points, 1.7 rebounds and 1.6 assists per game. After making the transition to point guard in his rookie season, West was named the starting point guard at the beginning of the 2005–06 season by head coach Doc Rivers.

In 2005–06, West averaged 11.8 PPG, 4.1 RPG and 4.6 APG. On February 12, 2006, he was named to represent the Celtics on the sophomore team for the Rookie Challenge at NBA All-Star Weekend. Coincidentally, he replaced his college teammate Jameer Nelson, who withdrew because of injuries.

West was moved to the shooting guard spot in the 2006–07 season, but showed signs of difficulty early in the season. He was later moved back to the point guard position. West had some clutch shots, including a game-winning buzzer-beater against the Charlotte Bobcats on November 8, 2006, and a game-tying three pointer with 4 seconds remaining in regulation to bring the game into overtime against the New Jersey Nets on March 3, 2007. The Celtics would eventually win the game against the Nets. The next day against the Minnesota Timberwolves, West scored a career-high 31 points and made a career-high 12 free throw shots, in a double overtime Celtics victory. West scored all 31 of his points in that game during the second half and the two overtimes. At the end of the 2006–07 season, he was sharing starting minutes with Rajon Rondo.

Seattle Supersonics (2007–2008)
After three seasons in Boston, on June 27, 2007, he was traded along with Wally Szczerbiak and the 5th overall pick in the 2007 NBA draft (Jeff Green (basketball)) to Seattle SuperSonics in exchange for Ray Allen and Glen Davis.

Cleveland Cavaliers (2008–2010)

2007–08 season 
On February 21, 2008, West was part of a three-team trade that sent him, Ben Wallace, Joe Smith, and Wally Szczerbiak to the Cleveland Cavaliers. The trade also sent Larry Hughes, Shannon Brown, Drew Gooden, and Cedric Simmons to the Chicago Bulls and Donyell Marshall, Ira Newble, and Adrian Griffin to Seattle. He was reunited with his Saint Joseph's teammate Dwayne Jones.

As a Cavalier, West played in 26 regular season games (starting all 26), and averaged 10.3 points, 4.5 assists, 3.7 rebounds and 1.1 steals. He had a season high 20 points against the Boston Celtics only six days after his trade to the Cavaliers and a season-high 11 assists on March 30, 2008 against the Philadelphia 76ers. For the entire season, West played in 61 games (starting 31) and averaged 8.3 points, 3.8 assists and 3.2 rebounds.

On April 27, 2008, West made perhaps the most timely 3-pointer of his NBA career with 5.4 seconds left in a playoff game against the Washington Wizards, in Washington. His tie-breaking game-winner took the Cleveland Cavaliers to a 3–1 lead in this first round series.

2008–09 season 
On September 12, 2008, West signed a three-year, $12.7 million contract with the Cavaliers. He was moved to the starting shooting guard position at the beginning of the season, due to the acquisition of Mo Williams.

He became a starter for the Cavaliers, who won a league-best and franchise-record 66 games during the regular season and went 39–2 at home. In addition to his role as the starting shooting guard, he also served as the backup point guard, manning the position when Mo Williams was not in the game. He emerged as a talented backcourt defensive player, guarding a variety of players ranging from the  Ben Gordon to the  Hedo Türkoğlu. Offensively, he proved to be a capable outside shooter, with a field-goal percentage of 46% (and 40% on three-pointers), and maintained his reputation as an athletic and hard-nosed driver with the ball. West, Williams, Zydrunas Ilgauskas, and Anderson Varejão came together to form a supporting cast for franchise player LeBron James.

On March 2, 2009, against the Miami Heat, West set a career high with eight steals.

In the playoffs, West's averages shot up to nearly 14 points per game, despite struggling with his three-point shot much like his backcourt-mate Williams, whose shooting struggles in the playoffs were well documented. Further, the Cavs' lack of scoring punch on the bench forced West to take on extremely high minute loads. He averaged 42 minutes per game throughout the postseason, and in the Eastern Conference Finals against the Orlando Magic (which the Cavs lost in six games due in part to, again, outside shooting struggles from Williams and West) he played over 45 minutes per game, more than any other player in the series. In addition to this, he drew the defensive assignment of Hedo Türkoğlu, who had a seven-inch height advantage, to allow James to play the "rover". West was able to stop Türkoğlu's facilitation of the Magic offense in spurts, but the height advantage was too much, as Türkoğlu helped to dominate the Cavalier defense throughout the series. West set a new career playoff high in points, with 22 in a losing effort in Game 6 against the Magic when the Cavs were eliminated.

2009–10 season 
Over the 2009–10 season, Delonte West averaged 8.8 points in 25 minutes per game with only three games as a starter for the Cavs. In the 2010 NBA Playoffs, the Cavaliers lost in the Conference Semifinals series to the Boston Celtics in six games. West averaged 6.7 points in the playoffs.

Return to Celtics (2010–2011)
After LeBron James left the Cavaliers to sign with the Miami Heat, the Cavaliers traded West, along with Sebastian Telfair, to the Minnesota Timberwolves for Ramon Sessions, Ryan Hollins, and a future draft pick. The Timberwolves waived West shortly after acquiring him.

On September 1, 2010, the Boston Celtics signed West to a one-year contract to back up Rajon Rondo as a point guard.

West was suspended for the first ten games of the 2010–11 season following a guilty plea to weapons charges in Maryland. For the 2010–11 season, West finished with 5.6 points per game, 0.8 steals per game, and 2.7 assists per game. He also shot .867 from the free throw line.

Dallas Mavericks (2011–2012)
West signed with the Dallas Mavericks on December 13, 2011. During the 2011–12 season, he averaged 9.6 points per game. He re-signed with the Mavericks on July 26, 2012.

West was suspended indefinitely following an argument after a preseason loss on October 15, 2012. He was reinstated after one day, but suspended again on October 25 for the same reason after another preseason loss. On October 29, 2012, West was waived by the Mavericks.

Texas Legends (2013)
On January 25, 2013, West was acquired by the Texas Legends of the NBA D-League. On March 16, 2013, West made his debut for the Legends with 10 points in an 85–103 loss to the Santa Cruz Warriors.

Fujian Xunxing (2013–2014) 
In October 2013, West signed a one-year deal with Fujian Xunxing of China.

Shanghai Sharks (2014) 
In July 2014, West joined the Los Angeles Clippers for the 2014 NBA Summer League.

In September 2014, West signed a one-year deal with the Shanghai Sharks, returning to China for a second stint. However, he was released by the team on November 18 after just four games despite a 29-point debut game in the season opener on November 1.

Return to Legends (2015) 
On January 12, 2015, West signed with Guaros de Lara of the Venezuelan Liga Profesional de Baloncesto but left the team before playing in a game for them.

On March 12, 2015, West was reacquired by the Texas Legends and appeared for them that night against the Delaware 87ers. In 19 minutes off the bench, he recorded 10 points and six rebounds in a 122–119 loss. On April 2, he was waived by the Legends after suffering a season-ending injury.

Personal life
West has described his childhood as "happy-poor," and has said that he lived with various relatives. During his teen years, West states that he abused drugs, engaged in self-harm, and spent time in children's hospitals.

West is multiracial, with African American, Piscataway Native American, and White American heritage. 
West was diagnosed with bipolar disorder in 2008. While he initially accepted the diagnosis, he later disputed it, suggesting that his difficulties arose from a combination of temporary depression and the stresses of a basketball player lifestyle.

On September 17, 2009, West was pulled over for a traffic violation while riding a Can-Am Spyder three-wheeled motorcycle. During this stop, it was found that West had a 9mm Beretta pistol in his waistband, a Ruger .357 Magnum revolver strapped to his leg, and a Remington 870 shotgun in a guitar case across his back. He was subsequently arrested and had a court appearance on November 20. West contended that he was moving the weapons to a different location because his mother had informed him that his cousins' children had stumbled upon them in a closet at his home. West pleaded guilty to the traffic and weapons charges and was sentenced to electronic monitoring, unsupervised probation, and 40 hours of community service as well as psychological counseling.

While West has purchased homes for each of his parents and has provided other financial support for relatives, he has also experienced financial difficulties. During the 2011 NBA lockout, he applied for a job at Home Depot and worked at a furniture store.

West's first marriage ended in divorce in 2010. He married Caressa Madden in 2013. They have two sons.

In February 2016, West was photographed in a public place in Houston, Texas, while barefoot and wearing a hospital gown. In June 2016, a photo of West panhandling in Temple Hills, Maryland, went viral. The photo sparked speculation that West was homeless, as the Twitter account that broke the photo suggested as such and asked his followers to pray for West given his psychological issues. West immediately denied the rumors, stating that, while the photo is genuine, he has a home and was merely assisting someone who actually was homeless, since the homeless man was quadriplegic.

In January 2020, a video surfaced showing West in handcuffs on a Washington, DC, highway.

On September 28, 2020, after photos circulated showing West as panhandling at an intersection in Dallas, Texas, Mavericks owner Mark Cuban picked up West from a gas station. Cuban paid for drug rehabilitation treatment and provided West a hotel room to stay in. On January 19, 2021, reports came in that West now has a job at the rehab facility where he checked in and has reunited with his mother. In July 2022, new videos came to light showing West begging again, this time in Virginia. 

On October, 15 2022, West was arrested again in Fairfax County, Virginia, after being seen trying to enter a car that did not belong to him. He was booked on four misdemeanor charges.

NBA career statistics

Regular season

|-
| style="text-align:left;"| 
| style="text-align:left;"| Boston
| 39 || 7 || 13.0 || .426 || .358 || .704 || 1.7 || 1.4 || .5 || .2 || 4.3
|-
| style="text-align:left;"| 
| style="text-align:left;"| Boston
| 71 || 71 || 34.1 || .487 || .385 || .851 || 4.1 || 4.6 || 1.2 || .6 || 11.8
|-
| style="text-align:left;"| 
| style="text-align:left;"| Boston
| 69 || 47 || 32.2 || .427 || .365 || .853 || 3.0 || 4.4 || 1.1 || .5 || 12.2
|-
| style="text-align:left;"| 
| style="text-align:left;"| Seattle
| 35 || 5 || 20.8 || .388 || .339 || .667 || 2.7 || 3.2 || .9 || .3 || 6.8
|-
| style="text-align:left;"| 
| style="text-align:left;"| Cleveland
| 26 || 26 || 31.0 || .440 || .367 || .788 || 3.7 || 4.5 || 1.1 || .7 || 10.3
|-
| style="text-align:left;"| 
| style="text-align:left;"| Cleveland
| 64 || 64 || 33.6 || .457 || .399 || .833 || 3.2 || 3.5 || 1.5|| .2 || 11.7
|-
| style="text-align:left;"| 
| style="text-align:left;"| Cleveland
| 60 || 3 || 25.0 || .445 || .325 || .810 || 2.8 || 3.3 || .9|| .5 || 8.8
|-
| style="text-align:left;"| 
| style="text-align:left;"| Boston
| 24 || 2 || 18.9 || .458 || .364 || .867 || 1.5 || 2.7 || .8 || .4 || 5.6
|-
| style="text-align:left;"| 
| style="text-align:left;"| Dallas
| 44 || 33 || 24.1 || .461 || .355 || .886 || 2.3 || 3.2 || 1.3 || .3 || 9.6
|- class="sortbottom"
| style="text-align:center;" colspan="2"| Career
| 432 || 258 || 27.4 || .448 || .372 || .826 || 2.9 || 3.6 || 1.1 || .4 || 9.7

Playoffs

|-
| style="text-align:left;"| 2005
| style="text-align:left;"| Boston
| 7 || 3 || 16.4 || .524 || .455 || .500 || 1.3 || .6 || 1.0 || .1 || 4.1
|-
| style="text-align:left;"| 2008
| style="text-align:left;"| Cleveland
| 13 || 13 || 34.8 || .400 || .429 || .854 || 3.3 || 4.2 || 1.2 || .5 || 10.8
|-
| style="text-align:left;"| 2009
| style="text-align:left;"| Cleveland
| 14 || 14 || 42.2 || .465 || .333 || .833 || 3.5 || 4.1 || 1.4 || .5 || 13.8
|-
| style="text-align:left;"| 2010
| style="text-align:left;"| Cleveland
| 11 || 0 || 24.5 || .418 || .158 || .938 || 1.9 || 2.6 || .8 || .3 || 6.7
|-
| style="text-align:left;"| 2011
| style="text-align:left;"| Boston
| 9 || 0 || 18.9 || .468 || .368 || .800 || 1.9 || 1.3 || .6 || .0 || 6.6
|-
| style="text-align:left;"| 2012
| style="text-align:left;"| Dallas
| 4 || 3 || 22.0 || .423 || .500 || 1.000 || 1.8 || 2.0 || .8 || .0 || 7.5
|- class="sortbottom"
| style="text-align:center;" colspan="2"| Career
| 58 || 33 || 29.0 || .442 || .361 || .847 || 2.5 || 2.8 || 1.0 || .3 || 9.1

References

External links

NBA D-League Profile
ESPN.com Profile
Yahoo!.com Profile

1983 births
Living people
African-American basketball players
All-American college men's basketball players
American expatriate basketball people in China
American men's basketball players
Basketball players from Washington, D.C.
Boston Celtics draft picks
Boston Celtics players
Cleveland Cavaliers players
Dallas Mavericks players
Fujian Sturgeons players
People with bipolar disorder
Point guards
Saint Joseph's Hawks men's basketball players
Seattle SuperSonics players
Shanghai Sharks players
Shooting guards
Texas Legends players